Porcinolus is a genus of pill beetles in the family Byrrhidae. There are at least three described species in Porcinolus.

Species
These three species belong to the genus Porcinolus:
 Porcinolus crescentifer Casey
 Porcinolus hystrix Casey
 Porcinolus undatus (Melsheimer, 1844)

References

Further reading

 
 

Byrrhidae
Articles created by Qbugbot